The Banquet, (in Chinese 豪門夜宴) also Party of a Wealthy Family, is a 1991 Hong Kong comedy film. It was quickly filmed for a Hong Kong flood relief charity, after the Yangtze River flooded in July of that year, killing over 1,700 people and displacing many more in the eastern and southern regions of mainland China.

A large ensemble of actors and crew (including multiple directors and cinematographers) worked on the film, many in supporting roles and cameos. The principal star is Eric Tsang.

Plot
Developer Tsang Siu-Chi (Eric Tsang) and his agent (Jacky Cheung) have bought two of a group of four properties. Rival developer, Boss Hung (Sammo Hung) has secured the other two properties. Both aim to buy all four so they can knock them down and build hotels.

The agent learns that billionaire Kuwait Prince Allabarba (George Lam) is due to arrive in Hong Kong and advises Tsang that they could dupe him in order to gain a billion dollar contract. The prince's father has recently died and the prince bitterly regrets that he was not a good son.

The agent tells Tsang that he should make a show of the positive relationship he has with his father, to impress the prince. Unfortunately, Tsang has not seen his father (Richard Ng) for 10 years. Along with his wife (Carol Cheng) and his sycophantic assistant (Tony Leung Chiu Wai), Tsang heads off to bring his father back. When they meet up, Tsang pretends to have cancer to convince his father to come home, along with his sister (Rosamund Kwan) and her husband (Tony Leung Ka Fai).

Tsang throws a banquet to impress the prince, pretending that it is also a birthday party for his father. However, it has all been a ploy by the agent, who has secretly been working for Boss Hung.

Cast
Almost 100 well-known Hong Kong actors appeared in the film, many of them in cameo roles.
The core cast consists of:
 Eric Tsang – Tsang Siu-Chi
 Sammo Hung – Boss Hung Tai-Po
 Jacky Cheung – Jacky Cheung Ah Hok Yau
 John Shum – Curly, Boss Hung's assistant
 Tony Leung Chiu-Wai – Wai, Tsang's assistant
 Rosamund Kwan – Gigi, Tsang's sister
 Tony Leung Ka-Fai – Leung, Gigi's husband
 Richard Ng – Father Tsang
 Carol Cheng (Cheng Yu-Ling, aka Do Do Cheng) – Mimi, Tsang's wife
 Joey Wong – Honey, Jacky's wife
 George Lam – Prince Alibaba of Kuwait ("Allabarba" in subtitles)
 Kwan Hoi San – Uncle Chicken Roll
 Lau Siu-Ming – Wong
 Jamie Luk – Vassal
 Pau Hon Lam – Uncle Lotus Seed Bun
 Michelle Reis – Kar-Yan Li
 Lydia Shum – Aunt Bill (as Lydia Sham)
 Bill Tung – Uncle Bill
 Raymond Wong – Forty
 Gabriel Wong – Vassal
 Stephen Chow – Himself
 Andy Lau – Presenter
 Maggie Cheung – Personal Singing Instructor
 Chin Kar Lok
 Leslie Cheung – Himself
 Anita Mui – Herself
 Aaron Kwok – Leslie's Younger Brother
 Anthony Chan
 Ti Lung – Cook # 2
 Kara Hui – Household Servant
 Teresa Mo – Presenter
 Simon Yam – Wai's friend, body language instructor & gigolo
 David Wu – Jogger
 John Woo – Guest
 Yuen Miu
 Mars
 Yuen Tak
 Sandra Ng – Trolley Waitress
 Andrew Yu
 Candice Yu
 Eric Kot – English Instructor
 Jan Lamb
 Karl Maka – Wai's uncle, make-up artist
 Sally Yeh – Herself
 Sylvia Chang – Herself
 Angie Chiu
 Gong Li – Herself
 Michael Hui – Himself
 Leon Lai – Cook Assistant
 Alan Tam – Ali Baba dream version
 Ng Man Tat – Cook #1
 Meg Lam
 Wong Wan-Si
 Kenneth Tsang – Waiter
 Teddy Robin – Football player
 Alfred Cheung
 Philip Chan – Police Officer
 Melvin Wong – Guest
 Billy Lau
 Gordon Liu
 Maria Cordero – Guest
 Gloria Yip
 Josephine Koo
 Hoi Sang Lee
 Mimi Zhu – Guest
 Tai Chi Squadron – Music Band
 Grasshopper
 Lowell Lo – Taxi Driver
 Anglie Leung
 Lau Kar Leung – Martial Arts Instructor for Fencing
 Fung Hak On
The character of Father Tsang has a number of staff, including a sword expert, Master Lau / Uncle Nine (Lau Kar-leung), a servant (Kara Hui), two English teachers (Eric Kot and Jan Lamb), a make-up artist Mak (Karl Maka) and a body language expert / gigolo (Simon Yam).

Tsang Siu-Chu has a daydream about the banquet, in which his imagined self is played by Leslie Cheung, with Aaron Kwok as his brother, and the imagined Prince Allabarba is played by George Lam. He also fantasises that a stream of attractive actresses including Anita Mui, Sally Yeh, Sylvia Chang, Angie Chiu and Gong Li attend the meal. These are followed by leading Hong Kong actors including Anthony Chan Yau, Stephen Chow and Michael Hui (accompanied by Maria Cordero). All of these actors play themselves in the dream sequence, and some return in additional roles at the actual banquet.

At the actual banquet, Tsang's staff include cooks Leon Lai and Ng Man Tat, servants Meg Lam and Wong Wan-Si, and waiting staff May Lo Mei-Mei, Sandra Ng, Fennie Yuen, Ti Lung and Kenneth Tsang.

Guests at the banquet include David Chiang, Tony Ching, Ku Feng, Carina Lau, Lee Hoi San, Loletta Lee, Waise Lee, Maggie Cheung, Bryan Leung, Mars, Lawrence Ng, Barry Wong, Johnnie To, Melvin Wong, John Woo, Pauline Yeung, Gloria Yip, Chor Yuen, Tai Chi Squadron, Yuen Cheung Yan, Mimi Zhu and the band members of Grasshopper.

The band performing at the banquet are played by Paul Wong, Wong Ka Kui, Wong Ka Keung and Yip Sai Wing.

Further roles include Teresa Mo and Andy Lau as TV presenters, with Teddy Robin Kwan,  Wan Chi Keung and Billy Lau as soccer players. Philip Chan and Anglie Leung play a pair of cops, chasing a thief played by Tommy Wong. Additional cameos include Josephine Koo as a photographer, James Wong as a food vendor, David Wu as a jogger, Lowell Lo as a cab driver, and Mars (actor) as an unknown role.

Box office
The film grossed HK $21.92 million in Hong Kong.

See also
 List of Hong Kong films

References

External links
 
 
 The Banquet at the Hong Kong Movie DataBase

1991 films
Hong Kong comedy films
1990s Cantonese-language films
Hong Kong cuisine
Films directed by Tsui Hark